Fruits of Nature, is the debut studio album by the American hip hop group The UMC's. It was released in October 15, 1991 by Wild Pitch Records.

Track listing

Credits
Vocals - Berkeley Carroll Summer Choir, Alton Sharpton, Tonya Wilcox
Audio Engineer, Audio Production - Haas G, RNS
Audio Engineer - Shlomo Sonnenfeld
Mixing, Production - Hass G
Cello - Richard Locker
DJ - Kid Magic

Charts

References

1991 debut albums
The U.M.C.'s albums
Wild Pitch Records albums